The Motorola Marco was a Newton OS-based personal digital assistant from Motorola, launched in January 1995 at MacWorld. It was unique in that it included a compatible RadioMail and ARDIS network radio antenna, which allowed users to check and send e-mail, as well as receive and send text messages.

In 2007, Motorola dusted off the Marco moniker and used it as the name for a new cell phone line.

Hardware specifications
The Marco depended on a vigorously changed form of the MessagePad 120 in a custom case with remote capacities. It utilized a similar 20 MHz ARM 610 processor with a modified 5 MB ROM and 1 MB of static RAM. Newton OS 1.3 utilized 544 KB, leaving 480 KB accessible for client information. Extra room could be extended through the PCMCIA Type II opening. There was actual space briefly opening which was closed off and not empowered in programming. The monochrome LCD screen showed 320 x 240 pixels.

References

External links
Newtman's Motorola Marco site
Luckey's Marco site

Apple Newton
Marco
Personal digital assistants